Chesterville is a municipality in the Arthabaska district of the Centre-du-Québec (Bois-Francs) region of Quebec, on Route 161 approximately  northeast of Montreal.

Geography

The town's mountainous terrain in the heart of the Canadian Appalachians has earned it the nickname of "Quebec's little Switzerland," and boasts a picturesque location adjacent to the northern Nicolet river.

History

The first settlers to the area arrived in 1835, but colonization actually began in spring 1849 with the establishment of a Catholic parish.

Demographics

The principal source of income in Chesterville is agriculture and forest exploitation.

Attractions

The free annual Symposium L'Accueil des Grands Peintres (art symposium) attracts many art lovers and features exhibits, artist conferences, workshops, local fare, and other cultural activities.

«Clairière - Art et Nature» is a 2 km forest path and natural amphitheatre dedicated to Professional site specific visual arts and musical concerts. Annual week-ends events are presented in August and September; they are open to the public.

References

External links
 Official site

Municipalities in Quebec
Incorporated places in Centre-du-Québec